Kevin Colleoni (born 11 November 1999 in Ponte San Pietro) is an Italian cyclist, who currently rides for UCI WorldTeam .

Major results

2017
 5th Trofeo Emilio Paganessi
2019
 2nd GP Capodarco
 4th Overall Giro della Friuli Venezia Giulia
1st  Young rider classification
 4th G.P. Palio del Recioto
 5th Trofeo Città di San Vendemiano
 8th Il Piccolo Lombardia
2020
 2nd Trofeo Città di San Vendemiano
 3rd Overall Giro Ciclistico d'Italia
 9th Il Piccolo Lombardia
2021
 9th Overall Tour de Hongrie
2022
 3rd Overall Czech Cycling Tour
 7th Overall Tour of Oman
 10th Per sempre Alfredo

References

External links
 
 

1999 births
Living people
Italian male cyclists
People from Ponte San Pietro
Cyclists from the Province of Bergamo